Koo Sang-Min (born 31 October 1991) is a South Korean footballer who plays as a goalkeeper for Busan IPark.

Career
While playing for Ulsan Dolphins, Koo scored a goal directly from a goal kick on 25 June 2014 in a victory over Gimhae City. It is the longest goal of all time. The following year, he was named as the National League MVP as Ulsan finished top of the division. Koo signed with Busan IPark from Ulsan Dolphins on 13 January 2016. Koo was first-choice keeper in his first season with the club, conceding 25 goals in 32 games, but he later faced competition for the starting spot from the likes of Kim Hyung-keun and Kim Kyeong-min. Midway through the 2019 season Koo left to complete his mandatory military service with Yangju Citizen FC in the K League 3 before returning to Busan in April 2021. Koo found himself back-up keeper to Ahn Joon-soo under struggling Portuguese manager Ricardo Peres, but replacement coach Park Jin-sub reinstated Koo to the starting line-up midway through the 2022 season.

Club career statistics
As of 15 October 2022

References

External links 
 

1991 births
Living people
Association football midfielders
South Korean footballers
Ulsan Hyundai Mipo Dockyard FC players
Busan IPark players
Korea National League players
K League 2 players